Evan Yardley (born 1 October 1993) is a Welsh rugby union player, currently playing for United Rugby Championship side Cardiff. His preferred position is hooker.

Cardiff
Yardley was called into Cardiff's European squad ahead of their European campaign. He made his debut for Cardiff in the first round of the 2021–22 European Rugby Champions Cup against  coming on as a replacement.

References

External links
itsrugby.co.uk Profile

1993 births
Living people
Welsh rugby union players
Ospreys (rugby union) players
Scarlets players
Cardiff Rugby players
Rugby union hookers